Ghislain Zulémaro is a French Guianan professional football manager.

Career
Since 2008 until 2010 he coached the French Guiana national football team.

References

Place of birth missing (living people)
Living people
French football managers
French Guianan football managers
French Guiana national football team managers
Year of birth missing (living people)